Ariane Chemin, born in 1962, is a French journalist and writer.

She graduated in humanities and is an alumna of Sciences Po.

In 2011, Ariane Chemin joined Le Monde.

Michel Houellebecq sued Le Monde for one of Chemin's articles but lost and had to pay 4000 euros to the newspaper.

In 2015, she received the Marie Claire prize.

References

External links 
 

1962 births
Living people
French journalists
French non-fiction writers
French women journalists
French women non-fiction writers
Sciences Po alumni
French essayists